Bariba may refer to:
 Bariba people
 Bariba language

Language and nationality disambiguation pages